Mesnilus is a genus of flies in the family Tachinidae.

Species
Mesnilus cyanella (Mesnil, 1978)
Mesnilus hexachaeta (Mesnil, 1978)
Mesnilus nigella (Mesnil, 1978)
Mesnilus plumosus (Mesnil, 1978)
Mesnilus prasinus (Mesnil, 1978)
Mesnilus setosus (Mesnil, 1978)

References

Tachinidae
Insects of Madagascar
Diptera of Africa